"New Direction" is a song by British pop group S Club Juniors, released as the third single from their debut album, Together (2002). Released on 7 October 2002, the song reached number two on the UK Singles Chart, being their third consecutive release to do so. For radio airplay, the song was remixed as the "Magic Fly" mix, which samples the song "Magic Fly" by Space.

Composition

Frankie Sandford sings the first and third verses, backing vocals in the second and fourth verses, the song's bridges along with Stacey, the solo's vocals in the song main bridge along with Stacey, a vocal during this bridge, and backing vocals during the end of the song. Stacey McClean sings backing vocals in the first and third verses, the second and fourth verses, the song's bridges along with Frankie, the solo's vocals in the song main bridge along with Frankie, a vocal during this bridge, and backing vocals during the end of the song. Calvin Goldspink, Aaron Renfree, Rochelle Wiseman, Daisy Evans, Hannah Richings, and Jay Asforis do not have any solos in this song.

Track listings
UK CD1
 "New Direction"
 "New Direction" (Magic Fly mix)
 "New Direction" (illicit mix)
 "New Direction" (video)

UK CD2 and cassette single
 "New Direction"
 "One Step Closer" (Almighty Jelly & Cream mix)
 "New Direction" (karaoke version)

Credits and personnel
Credits are lifted from the Together album booklet.

Studio
 Mastered at Transfermation (London, England)

Personnel

 Georgie Dennis – writing
 Ricky Hanley – writing
 Gary White – writing, production
 Didier Marouani – writing (Magic Fly mix)
 Jewels & Stone – production, additional production and remix (Magic Fly mix)
 Tim "Speg" Speight – mixing
 Richard Dowling – mastering

Charts

Weekly charts

Year-end charts

References

S Club 8 songs
19 Recordings singles
2002 singles
2002 songs
Polydor Records singles